This is the results breakdown of the local elections held in Navarre on 26 May 2019. The following tables show detailed results in the autonomous community's most populous municipalities, sorted alphabetically.

Opinion polls

City control
The following table lists party control in the most populous municipalities, including provincial capitals (shown in bold). Gains for a party are displayed with the cell's background shaded in that party's colour.

Municipalities

Barañain
Population: 20,039

Burlada
Population: 18,934

Egüés
Population: 20,774

Estella
Population: 13,673

Pamplona
Population: 199,066

Tafalla
Population: 10,605

Tudela
Population: 35,593

See also
2019 Navarrese regional election

References

Navarre
2019